Arthur Kwizera is a Ugandan anesthesiologist and intensivist, who serves as a Senior Lecturer in Anesthesiology and Critical Care at Makerere University College of Health Sciences. He also concurrently serves as staff intensivist at the Mulago National Referral Hospital intensive care unit. He is a member of the Ugandan Ministry of Health scientific advisory committee for COVID-19. He chairs the ad hoc committee, on research, based on evidence-based published global research, which informs the country's decisions regarding the pandemic.

Background and education
Kwizera was born in Uganda and he attended local primary and secondary schools. After obtaining his high school diploma, he was admitted to Makerere University School of Medicine, the oldest in East Africa. He graduated from there with a Bachelor of Medicine and Bachelor of Surgery degree. After internship, he went back to Makerere and obtained a Master of Medicine degree in Anesthesiology and Critical Care. As of June 2020, Kwizera is pursuing a Doctor of Philosophy degree with joint supervision by Makerere University and the University of Cambridge in the United Kingdom. His PhD research focuses on acute respiratory failure and its treatment, particularly in low resource countries, like Uganda.

Career
As a university lecturer at the country's oldest medical school and as an intensivists at the nation's highest tertiary referral hospital, Kwizera is a skilled medical practitioner determined to improve medical care through research and clinical excellence. He is a member of an international collaborative effort, to examine  acute care in resource-limited settings with particular emphasis on sepsis management as well as anaesthesia and intensive care education.

Other considerations
Due to the skill-sets that he possesses, he is a member of the Ministry of Health's Infrastructure Committee which is tasked with setting up ICUs in Uganda's fifteen regional referral hospitals. He is tasked with recommending the proper equipment specifications and designing floor plans for the ICUs in these hospitals.

Dr. Kwizera, chairs the National Intensive Care Committee tasked with developing the National Intensive Care Strategic Plan. That plan will guide the expansion of Uganda's intensive care capacity to at least 4,000 acute care beds. He, together with a team from the University of Cambridge are developing a ventilator to be used in hard to reach places in the world.

See also
 Emmy Okello
 Moses Kamya
 Nelson Sewankambo

References

External links
 About the Thrive Program and Network
 Mulago to revise ICU fees amid high costs in private facilities As of 14 August 2019.

Alumni of the University of Cambridge
Law Development Centre alumni
Living people
Academic staff of Makerere University
Makerere University alumni
People from Western Region, Uganda
Ugandan anaesthetists
University of British Columbia alumni
Year of birth missing (living people)